Aries is the ninth studio album by Mexican recording artist Luis Miguel. It was released by WEA Latina on 22 June 1993. After attaining commercial success in 1991 with his previous album, Romance, Luis Miguel decided to return to a style similar to his earlier work, featuring pop ballads and dance numbers with R&B influences. The record was produced by Luis Miguel, who was assisted by Kiko Cibrian, Rudy Pérez, David Foster, and Juan Luis Guerra.

Three singles were released to promote the album. The first two singles, "Ayer" and "Hasta Que Me Olvides,"  topped the US Billboard Hot Latin Songs chart and the third, "Suave," peaked at number nine. Two other songs were released as promotional singles, "Hasta el Fin" and "Tú y Yo"; both peaked at number four on the Hot Latin Songs chart. To further promote the record, Luis Miguel launched the 1993 Aries Tour to some Latin American countries and the United States.

Aries peaked at number one on the US Billboard Latin Pop Albums, where it stayed for 19 weeks. Internationally, the album was certified triple platinum in Mexico, where it sold over one million copies. It was also certified diamond in Argentina. Aries sold over three million copies worldwide. Upon its release, the album received mixed reviews from music critics; they were divided on the dance tunes and ballads, although Luis Miguel's vocals and the album's arrangements garnered positive reactions. Luis Miguel received several accolades, including the Grammy Award for Best Latin Pop Album.

Background and recording

In 1991 Miguel released his eighth studio album, Romance, a collection of classic boleros, the oldest of which originated in the 1940s. The album, which was produced by Armando Manzanero and arranged by Bebu Silvetti, was a commercial success in Latin America and sold over seven million copies worldwide. It revived interest in the bolero genre and was the first record by a Spanish-speaking artist to be certified gold in Brazil, Taiwan, and the United States. In spite of the album's success, Miguel did not want to release a follow-up record that was similar to Romance. When asked why he chose not to record more boleros, he replied "I wanted to try my music, just forgetting a little bit about those boleros that everyone knows". He began working with the composers for the album a year before recording in a studio in 1992; in Miguel's words, he wanted to "discuss the works, the themes, and melodies; ... The creation of an album has to be part of me or else I would not be able to interpret it, or sing in it".

On 24 August 1992, Mexican newspaper El Siglo de Torreón reported that Miguel had begun collaborating with David Foster and Juan Carlos Calderón on some compositions, along with English-speaking composers, and selecting cover versions for the album. He also received assistance from Cuban composer Rudy Pérez and Dominican singer-songwriter Juan Luis Guerra with the songwriting. Recording began on 4 July 1992. Miguel had difficulty finding a suitable producer for the record; he initially worked with American audio engineer Bruce Swedien, but decided to re-record the whole album after disagreements with Swedien's direction. Unable to find a producer, he decided to co-produce the album with his long-time associate Kiko Cibrian. Recording the album took almost a year and was affected by several complications, including its high budget of over US$1.5 million, his father's death, and an appendectomy. Miguel announced that the name of the album would be Aries during a presentation at the 1993 Festival Acapulco. About the naming of the album he said, "This album expresses my personal self. I had a lot to do. I produced everything and wanted to have a lot of fun, take what I like, and what better than the zodiacal sign representing what one is."

Composition

Aries is composed of ten tracks, six of which are romantic ballads. The remaining four songs are dance numbers which San Antonio Express-News editor Ramiro Burr describes as containing a "pop groove" and R&B influences, further comparing them to Miguel's earlier recordings before Romance. Miguel said the mixture of ballads and uptempo music was done to "keep a steady musical line" because he did not want his music to be unrecognizable. The dance tunes "Suave", "Dame Tu Amor", and "Que Nivel de Mujer" are "upbeat, brass-heavy, attitudinal numbers" while "Luz Verde" incorporates Latin hip hop and R&B. "Suave" features a saxophone solo by American musician Kirk Whalum and "Que Nivel de Mujer" is a Spanish-language adaptation of "Attitude Dance" by American band Tower of Power. The band members assisted with the horn section in the song, which was led by one of its lead members Emilio Castillo. Miguel said he included the band's song on the album because of his fondness for R&B in the 1970s, citing the group as one of his musical influences.

"Ayer" is a Spanish-language cover of David Foster's instrumental "All That My Heart Can Hold" with additional lyrics by Rudy Pérez. Burr characterized the song as a "lush ballad sung by Miguel in his stylistic
romantic swagger that simultaneously conveys pride and pain". Similarly, John Lannert wrote for the Sun-Sentinel that the track was comparable to Romances "sparse lyrical muse and smooth musical backdrop". Lannert also called Juan Luis Guerra's composition "Hasta Que Me Olvides" an "emotion-drenched love ode" and referred to "Me Niego Estar Solo" and "Hasta El Fin" as "desperate confessionals about being out of love". Achy Obejas of the Chicago Tribune labeled the ballads "Hasta El Fin" and "Tú y Yo" as "luxuriantly slow narratives of love lost".

Singles and promotion

"Ayer" was released as the lead single from Aries on 17 May 1993. It reached number one on the Billboard Hot Latin Songs chart in the United States the week of 17 July 1993, and stayed there for three weeks. The three music videos for "Ayer"  were directed by Benny Corral, Rubén Galindo, and Gustavo Garzón respectively. The music videos were filmed in a mansion in Mexico City.  "Ayer" ended 1993 as the sixth-best-performing Latin song of the year in the US. The album's second single, "Hasta Que Me Olvides", was released in August 1993 and reached number one on the Hot Latin Songs chart the week of October 23, and remained there for three weeks. The album's third single, "Suave", was released in 1993 and peaked at number nine on the Hot Latin Songs chart. Its music video was directed by Kiko Guerrero and features Miguel dancing  with several women on a beach. "Hasta el Fin" and "Tú y Yo" were released as promotional singles in the US and both peaked at number four on the Hot Latin Songs chart. "Pensar en Ti" received airplay in Mexico, while "Me Niego a Estar Solo" was released as a promotional single in Spain in 1993.

To promote the album, Miguel began his Aries Tour on 29 May at the 1993 Acapulco Festival in Mexico. After his performances in Mexico, he toured several countries in Latin America beginning with Argentina, and later performed in the US. His set list consisted mainly of pop songs and ballads from Aries and his earlier career, as well as boleros from Romance, which he performed during the second half of the concerts.

Critical reception

Upon its release, Aries received mixed reactions from music critics. AllMusic editor Jose F. Promis gave the album two-and-a-half stars out of five and found the ballads to be "sometimes a little too syrupy". He complimented some of the dance tunes such as "Suave" and "Dame Tu Amor", but said "Luz Verde" was a "somewhat dated attempt at early-'90s Latin hip-hop R&B". A music journalist for Billboard magazine wrote a favorable review of Aries, stating that Miguel "trades in nostalgic boleros for a stylish, up-to-date package" and called "Ayer" a "perfect transition track from Romance". Chicago Tribune music critic Achy Obejas gave the record two-and-a-half stars out of four, calling it "a kind of middle ground between Romance and its lush ballads, and the bouncy pop of 20 Años, its immediate antecedent". She praised Miguel's vocals as "wonderfully nuanced and dramatic",  and said the ballads mostly "work", but that "the uptempo tunes fall flat most of the time". Enrique Lopetegui of the Los Angeles Times gave the album three stars out of four; he lauded Miguel's inclusion of "healthy elements of jazz and funk into his polished sound" and said he "returns to familiar territory accompanied by his usual superb arrangements and musicianship".

Accolades
At the 36th Annual Grammy Awards in 1994, Miguel won the Grammy Award for Best Latin Pop Album for Aries. At the 6th Lo Nuestro Awards in the same year, the album won the award for Pop Album of the Year and Miguel was named Pop Male Artist of the Year. He also received two nominations in the category of Pop Song of the Year for "Hasta Que Me Olvides" and "Ayer"; the latter track was also nominated Video of the Year. At the inaugural Billboard Latin Music Awards in 1994, Miguel received two awards including Pop Album of the Year and Pop Male Artist of the Year. Miguel was awarded Best Male Singer, Best Male Show for the tour, and Best Disc for the album at the 1994 Eres awards.

Commercial performance
Aries was released internationally on 22 June 1993, although pirated cassettes of the album were being sold for $1 in Mexico ten days before the official release. WEA Latina prepared 500,000 copies to be distributed on the release date, but after finding legitimate copies of the compact disc were already being sold on the pirate market, they discovered only 300,000 units stored in their warehouse. WEA Latina responded to the piracy by having a Mexican radio station play the whole album a few days before its release. In Mexico, the album was certified triple platinum; it has sold over one million copies in the country. In the US, it debuted and peaked at number two on the Billboard Top Latin Albums chart, second to Gloria Estefan's album Mi Tierra. Aries remained in this position until it was replaced by the Gipsy Kings's album Love and Liberté 20 weeks later.

Aries peaked at number one on the Billboard Latin Pop Albums chart and stayed at the top for 19 weeks. It ended 1993 as the second best-selling Latin pop album in the US after Romance. In Argentina, the album peaked at number two on the album chart and was certified diamond by the Argentine Chamber of Phonograms and Videograms Producers for sales of 500,000 copies. Elsewhere in South America, the album peaked at number one on the Chilean albums chart and was certified platinum in Colombia. Aries sold over three million copies worldwide.

Track listing
All recordings produced by Luis Miguel and Kiko Cibrian, except where noted.

Personnel
Adapted from the Aries liner notes:

Musicians

 Robbie Buchanan – keyboards , arranger 
 Marcel East – keyboards, arranger and programming 
 Randy Kerber – keyboards, arranger 
 Nick Milo – keyboards 
 Jorge Calandrelli – electric piano, arranger 
 John Robinson – drums 
 Harvey Mason – drums 
 Francis Russ McKinnon – drums 
 Kiko Cibrian – guitar , background vocals , arranger , programing , brass arrangements 
 Michael Landau – guitar 
 Carmen Grillo – guitar 
 Paul Jackson, Jr. – guitar 
 Dean Parks – Acoustic guitar 
 Paulinho da Costa – percussion 
 Neil Stubenhaus – bass 
 Freddie Washington – bass 
 Rocco Prestia – bass 
 Jerry Hey – brass, brass arrangements 
 Dan Higgins – brass 
 Gary Grant – brass 
 Bill Reichenbach Jr. – brass 
 Kirk Whalum – saxophone solo 
 Emilio Castillo – tenor saxophone , background vocals 
 Brandon Fields – tenor saxophone 
 Stephen "Doc" Kupka – baritone saxophone 
 Greg Adams – trumpet, arranger 
 Lee Thornburg – trombone, trumpet 
 Tower of Power – guest artist 
 Annie Cruz – background vocals 
 Iliana Holland – background vocals 
 Dan Navarro – background vocals 
 Tom Bowes – background vocals 
The Hollywood String Ensemble 
 Ezra Kliger – concertmaster, violin
 Paul C. Shure – violin
 Shari Zippert – violin
 Roman Volodarsky – violin
 Barbara J. Porter – violin
 Vladimir Polimatidi – violin
 Cordon H. Marron – violin
 Charles H. Everett – violin
 Norman J. Hughes – violin
 Joel Derouin – violin
 Sid Page – violin
 Linda Rose – violin
 R.F. Peterson – violin
 John J. Wittenberg – violin
 Leslie J. Woodbury – violin
 Endre Granat – violin
 Alexander Horvath – violin
 Israel Baker – violin
 Herschel P. Wiserenita Koven – viola
 Raymond J. Tisher II – viola
 James J. Ross – viola
 John T. Acevedo – viola
 Cynthia Morrow – viola
 Larry Corbett – cello
 Daniel W. Smith – cello
 Nancy Stein – cello
 Roger Lebow – cello
 Steve G. Edelman – contrabass
 Jon C. Clarke – English horn, oboe
 Joseph Meyer – French horn
 Calvin Smith – French horn
 Michael A. Englander – percussion

Production

 Luis Miguel – producer
 Kiko Cibrian – co-producer
 Mauricio Abaroa – executive producer
 Julio Saenz – executive producer
 Benny Faccone – engineer, mixing 
 Humberto Gatica – mixing 
 Paul McKenna – mixing 
 Rudy Pérez – co-producer in the voice recording
 Emilio Castillo – co-producer in "Que Nivel De Mujer"
 Jose Quintana – production coordination
 Ezra Kliger – production coordination
 Jim Champagne – assistant engineer, mixing assistant
 Noel Hazen – assistant engineer, mixing assistant
 Bryan Pollack – assistant engineer, mixing assistant
 Kimm James – assistant engineer, mixing assistant
 Bernie Grundman – mastering
 Cartel Diseñadores – design
 Alfredo Gatica – artistic coordination
 Carlos Somonte – photography
 Bruce Swedien – special thanks for their collaboration in this production

Charts

Weekly charts

Year-end charts

All-time charts

Certifications and sales

See also
 1993 in Latin music
 List of diamond-certified albums in Argentina
 List of number-one Billboard Latin Pop Albums from the 1990s
 List of best-selling albums in Argentina
 List of best-selling albums in Chile
 List of best-selling albums in Mexico
 List of best-selling Latin albums

References

1993 albums
Albums produced by David Foster
Albums produced by Luis Miguel
Dance-pop albums by Mexican artists
Grammy Award for Best Latin Pop Album
Luis Miguel albums
Spanish-language albums
Warner Music Latina albums